Raphael catfish may refer to a number of different South American doradid catfish species:

 Chocolate Raphael catfish, two common aquarium fish: 
Acanthodoras cataphractus
Acanthodoras spinosissimus
 Giant Raphael catfish, Megalodoras uranoscopus
 Marbled Raphael catfish, Amblydoras nauticus, a common aquarium fish that often is mislabelled as Amblydoras hancockii
 Spotted Raphael catfish, two aquarium fish:
 Agamyxis albomaculatus
 Agamyxis pectinifrons
 Striped Raphael catfish or Southern striped Raphael catfish, Platydoras costatus, a common aquarium fish